Ursula "Ulla" Donath ( Jurewitz, later Brehme, born 30 July 1931) is an athlete from East Germany, who competed mainly in the 800 metres. She was born in Saldus, Latvia.

Donath competed for Germany in the 1960 Summer Olympics held in Rome, Italy in the 800 m where she won the bronze medal.

References

1931 births
Living people
Baltic-German people
German female middle-distance runners
Athletes (track and field) at the 1960 Summer Olympics
Olympic athletes of the United Team of Germany
Olympic bronze medalists for the United Team of Germany
People from Saldus
Medalists at the 1960 Summer Olympics
Olympic bronze medalists in athletics (track and field)